The 2014 Spa-Francorchamps GP3 Series round was a GP3 Series motor race held on August 22 and 23, 2014 at Circuit de Spa-Francorchamps, Belgium. It was the sixth round of the 2014 GP3 Series. The race supported the 2014 Belgian Grand Prix.

Classification

Qualifying

Feature race

See also 
 2014 Belgian Grand Prix
 2014 Spa-Francorchamps GP2 Series round

References 

Spa-Francorchamps
GP3